Felix Anthony "Milwaukee Phil" Alderisio (April 26, 1912 – September 25, 1971) was an American enforcer, bagman, hitman and burglar for the Chicago Outfit. He was underboss to Sam Giancana during the 1960s, and boss from 1967 to his imprisonment in 1969.

Early life
Alderisio began his criminal career as a teenager during the Prohibition era. One of his early arrests was for vagrancy; he frequently waited outside Outfit boss Al Capone's Lexington Hotel headquarters in the hope of getting a job as a messenger. In the early 1930s, Alderisio's maternal cousin Louis Fratto brought Alderisio into the Outfit. Alderisio began working with Sam Battaglia and John Marshall Caifano as an enforcer. Rising steadily through the ranks during the Great Depression, Alderisio soon gained a reputation for brutality. By the end of the decade, Alderisio was working under Jake "Greasy Thumb" Guzik, the Outfit's financial expert, as a bagman delivering payoffs to Chicago judges and police officials.

The Hitmobile
In the 1950s, Alderisio started working as an enforcer with Charles "Chuckie" Nicoletti. Throughout the next two decades, Nicoletti and Alderisio were frequently questioned by police about gangland "hits." On May 2, 1962, police questioned the two men in a car that they had customized into a so-called, "hit mobile".  The black car had special switches that independently controlled the headlights and tail lights to avoid police detection. There was a hidden compartment in the back with clamps for shotguns, rifles, and pistols. On this occasion, Alderisio and Nicoletti claimed they were, '"... waiting for a friend", and the police released them without charges.

Alderisio was suspected in carrying out 13 or 14 "hits" for The Outfit.

Criminal enterprises
Alderisio headed a group of cat burglars that operated in Chicago's upscale Gold Coast district. These thieves specialized in rare gems and jewelry, which they fenced to Outfit-controlled jewelry stores and wholesalers. Alderisio resided in the Gold Coast for a time; his unsuspecting neighbors were his targets. Alderisio also owned several restaurants, meat packing firms, small hotels, Rush Street nightclubs, bordellos and striptease joints.

Rise to underboss
During the 1950s and 1960s, Alderisio's crew was responsible for picking up payoffs from North Side restaurants and nightclubs.  He also served as the principal bagman for North Side bookmaking operations, delivering millions of dollars in payments each week to the Outfit leadership. Serving directly under Giancana and later under Gus "Gussie" Alex, Alderisio was identified by federal authorities in the early 1960s as a high-ranking member of the Outfit. During the Permanent Subcommittee on Investigations of the U.S. Senate Committee on Government Operations investigations on organized crime, Alderisio would plead the Fifth Amendment to the U.S. Constitution against self-incrimination 23 times and refuse to testify.

In May 1962, Alderisio participated in an infamous mob torture incident. After a barroom fight, two small-time criminals, Billy McCarthy and Jimmy Miraglia, had ambushed and killed Outfit associates Ron Scalvo and Phil Scalvo. Alderisio, Nicoletti, and Anthony Spilotro captured McCarthy and tortured him to provide Miraglia's name. They finally placed McCarthy's head in a vise and tightened it until one of his eyes popped out of its socket. At that point, McCarthy named Miraglia. Later that week, both McCarthy and Miraglia were found dead with their throats cut.

Often traveling abroad (either on vacation or establishing connections for smuggling heroin into the United States), Alderisio frequently visited Turkey, Italy, and Greece. He was passionate about classical ruins, spending hours photographing them. During one meeting with Giancana that was recorded by law enforcement, Alderisio spent about 20 minutes describing ruins he had recently seen in Europe. Finally, Giancana lost his patience and yelled:

Phil, goddammit! Ruins! I got coppers coming out of my eyeballs and you sit there telling me about ruins! Listen to me, Phil, listen real good! Ruins ain't garbage! Forget about them goddamn ruins!

Later years
Over several decades of criminal activity, Alderisio was arrested at least 36 times for assault and battery, bombing, racketeering, loansharking, illegal gambling, hijacking, narcotics, counterfeiting, bootlegging, bribery, extortion, and murder-for-hire. However, Alderisio usually avoided prosecution because of the Outfit's strong political connections. Yet, acting as Outfit boss for Tony Accardo in the late 1960s, he wasn't very popular with the "rank-and-file" Chicago mobsters. Within a short time, Alderisio was convicted of extortion and sent to prison.

Death
On September 25, 1971, Felix Alderisio died from natural causes at the United States Penitentiary, in Marion, Illinois. His funeral was attended by Accardo and many other Outfit members.

Notes

References
Devito, Carlo. Encyclopedia of International Organized Crime. New York: Facts On File, Inc., 2005. 
Repetto, Thomas. Bringing Down the Mob. New York: Henry Holt and Company, 2006.  
Sifakis, Carl. The Mafia Encyclopedia. New York: Da Capo Press, 2005.

Further reading
Demaris, Ovid. Captive City: Chicago in Chains. New York: Lyle Stewart Inc., 1969.
Demaris, Ovid. The Last Mafioso. New York: Bantam Books, 1981. 
Kwitny, Jonathan. Vicious Circles: The Mafia in the Marketplace. New York: W.W. Norton, 1979.
Thomas, Evan. The Man to See: Edward Bennett Williams - Ultimate Insider; Legendary Trial Lawyer. New York: Simon & Schuster, 1991.

External links
Chicago Sun-Times: A century of Chicago mob bosses 
The Assassination of John F. Kennedy Photographic Archive - Organized Crime: Felix "Milwaukee Phil" Alderisio

1912 births
1971 deaths
American gangsters of Italian descent
Chicago Outfit mobsters
Chicago Outfit bosses
Mafia extortionists
American people who died in prison custody
Prisoners who died in United States federal government detention